The Congregation of Sisters of Saint Agnes is a Catholic religious institute for women founded in 1858 and named in honor of Saint Agnes.  The Motherhouse is located in Fond du Lac, Wisconsin within the Archdiocese of Milwaukee.

History

The Congregation of Sisters of St. Agnes was founded in Barton, Wisconsin, on August 12, 1858. Father Caspar Rehrl (1809 - 1881), an Austrian missionary, established a sisterhood of pioneer women under the patronage of St. Agnes of Rome to whom he had a special devotion. At first the group suffered such untold hardship that, for a few months in 1861, it was reduced to one blind sister. 
 
The arrival of Mary Hazotte in 1863 gave the fledgling community a new life and leadership when she, in 1864 at the age of 17, was elected general superior. Mother Agnes Hazotte (1847 - 1905) directed the move from Barton to Fond du Lac, WI, in 1870 and served as the community's leader until her death in 1905. In 1870, Father Francis Haas became the spiritual director of the community and assisted in revising the original rule.

In 1893, land was purchased adjoining the convent grounds for the establishment of St. Agnes Hospital, which was dedicated on June 23, 1896.
 
These three founders paved the ways for growth and expansion. As of 2023, more than 200 vowed members of the Congregation minister throughout the United States and Nicaragua.

Membership
Catholic women who profess the vows of celibate chastity, poverty, and obedience are known as vowed members. Women and men of any religious background who are single, married, or divorced and desire to live out the Congregation's mission without professing the three vows are known as Associates.

Ministries
Vowed members are involved in the work of education, health care, social services, community service, church ministry, retreat ministry, prison ministry, spirituality and wellness, and non-profit service. The Congregation sponsors Marian University in Fond du Lac, Wisconsin.

References

Further reading
Margaret Lorimer, Ordinary Sisters: The Story of the Sisters of St. Agnes, Action Printing, 2007.

External links
Congregation of Sisters of St. Agnes official website
 "Fond du Lac's sisters of St. Agnes to celebrate 150th anniversary"

Catholic Church in Wisconsin
Catholic female orders and societies
Religious organizations established in 1858
Fond du Lac, Wisconsin
Catholic religious institutes established in the 19th century
1858 establishments in Wisconsin